A treasury is a financial safe-house.

Treasury may also refer to:

Arts, entertainment, and media
A Treasury, a 2004 album by Nick Drake
The Treasury (periodical), a 19th-century Welsh monthly for Calvinistic Methodists
Anthology, a collection of works by one writer or multiple writers
Omnibus edition, a collection of works, usually by a single writer

Government and finance 

 HM Treasury (His Majesty's Treasury), the treasury to the British government
 Ministry of the Treasury and Public Function, the treasury to the Spanish government
 Treasury (Australia), the treasury to the Australian government
 Treasury Board of Canada, a Cabinet committee of the Queen's Privy Council for Canada
 Treasury Board of Canada Secretariat, a central agency of the Canadian federal government
 United States Department of the Treasury, the treasury to the U.S. federal government
United States Treasury security, a government security

Other uses
The Treasury (store), a defunct chain of discount stores owned by JCPenney
The Treasury, a building in Singapore, occupied by the Ministry of Finance
 Treasury Casino, Brisbane, Australia

See also
Al Khazneh (lit. The Treasury), a temple in Petra, Jordan